Zhang Renjun (1846–1927) courtesy name Qianli was Viceroy of Liangguang from August 12, 1907, to June 28, 1909, and the last Viceroy of Liangjiang from June 28, 1909, until the overthrow of the Qing dynasty in the Xinhai Revolution and the establishment of the Republic of China on January 23, 1912.

1846 births
1927 deaths
Qing dynasty politicians from Hebei
Politicians from Tangshan
Political office-holders in Jiangsu
Assistant Grand Secretaries
Viceroys of Liangguang
Viceroys of Liangjiang